Daron Jay Norwood (September 30, 1965 – July 22, 2015) was an American country music singer. He released two albums for Giant Records and charted six times on Hot Country Songs.

Musical career
Signed to Giant Records in 1993, he released two albums (1994's Daron Norwood and 1995's Ready, Willing and Able) for the label and charted six singles on the Billboard Hot Country Songs charts. Two singles off his debut album, "If It Wasn't For Her I Wouldn't Have You" and "Cowboys Don't Cry", both made the country Top 40. The title track of his second album was later a Top 20 hit in 1996 for Lari White.

In late 1994, Norwood co-wrote and sang "Little Boy Lost" on the BNA Records album Keith Whitley: A Tribute Album, a tribute to Keith Whitley which featured a mix of original songs, covers of Whitley's material, and new compositions. Norwood also sang "Working Elf Blues" on the 1995 multi-artist album Giant Country Christmas, Volume 1.

Personal life
On November 5, 1995, Norwood decided to retire because of his addiction to alcohol. He told the Lubbock-Avalanche Journal that during that time period, he consumed 20 to 25 shots of Jack Daniel's a night.

Norwood also served as a motivational speaker. His program, called "Keep It Straight", was developed to warn children of the dangers of drug and alcohol abuse. Daron married Suella McCarty on July 5, 2009. Together they had children Krista, Delaney, Roxy, and Daylan.

Norwood was found dead in his Hereford, Texas, apartment by his landlord on the afternoon of July 22, 2015. The Associated Press reported he was last seen the previous night by friends.  Hereford police spokesperson, Capt. Kirsten Williams, stated on July 23 that Norwood's body showed no signs of trauma and that investigators did not suspect foul play. Williams further stated that cause of death was still pending.

Discography

Albums

Singles

Other charted songs

Music videos

References

1965 births
2015 deaths
American country singer-songwriters
American male singer-songwriters
Singer-songwriters from Texas
Giant Records (Warner) artists
People from Tahoka, Texas
American motivational speakers
20th-century American singers
21st-century American singers
People from Hereford, Texas
Country musicians from Texas
20th-century American male singers
21st-century American male singers